Omar Malik (born 9 April 1992) is a Norwegian former footballer, who used to play in Norway for FK Tønsberg. He was selected for the FK Tønsberg first team as a 15-year-old, and had a promising career.

He was troubled with injuries from an age of 16, and was in and out of the game until his retirement at the age of 20. He had a very promising footballer career ahead until his injuries troubled his young career. Rumours said that clubs like Everton were following Malik's progress in his early years before his injury started, which slowed down his talent and progression.

He was selected for the Pakistan national football team in 2012, and played in the friendly match against Singapore, picking up his first international cap in the process. That was his last attribution to football.

References

Pakistani footballers
Pakistan international footballers
Norwegian people of Pakistani descent
1992 births
Living people
FK Tønsberg players
Association football defenders